Sultan Azim ud-Din II (reigned 1763–1764, 1778–1791), was the 21st Sultan of Sulu. He was the son of Sultan Bantilan Muizz ud-Din, and cousin to Sultan Muhammad Israil ud-Din.

After the death of Sultan Bantilan Muizz ud-Din in 1763, he became the Sultan of Sulu; which lasted until 1764 when the British forced the restoration of the former Sultan Azim ud-Din I.

In 1778, he poisoned his cousin and the reigning Sultan Muhammad Israil ud-Din which led to his proclamation as the new sultan for the second time.

References

Sultans of Sulu
Filipino datus, rajas and sultans
Year of birth unknown
Year of death unknown
Filipino Muslims